Christoph Christian Ruben (November 30, 1805 – July 9, 1875) was a German painter.

Born in Trier, Ruben studied in Düsseldorf under Peter von Cornelius from 1823, and in 1826 settled in Munich, where he worked on the designs for the new stained glass windows for the Regensburg Cathedral and for a church in Auer. In 1836 he worked on designs for the decoration of Hohenschwangau Castle, and produced oil paintings as well. In 1841 he was appointed director at the Academy of Fine Arts in Prague, where he decorated the belvedere with wall paintings. He also painted a hall for the Prince of Salm and three altarpieces for the church in Turnau (modern-day Turnov, Czech Republic). From 1852 to 1872 he was director at the Academy of Fine Arts Vienna, where he died in 1875.  One of his sons, Franz Ruben, was also a painter.

Ruben's pupils included Jaroslav Čermák and Karel Javůrek.

References
 

19th-century German painters
German male painters
1805 births
1875 deaths
Academic staff of the Academy of Fine Arts, Prague
Academic staff of the Academy of Fine Arts Vienna
19th-century German male artists